Rennick Bay is an embayment of the coastline at the terminus of Rennick Glacier. It is bounded on the west and east by Belousov Point and Stuhlinger Ice Piedmont. The eastern part of the bay was discovered from the ship Terra Nova, of the British Antarctic Expedition (1910–13) under Scott. Named by the British Antarctic Expedition for Lieutenant Henry E. de P. Rennick, Royal Navy, an officer on the Terra Nova. The bay was photographed by U.S. Navy Operation Highjump (1947) and by the Soviet Antarctic Expedition (1958).

References 

Bays of Victoria Land
Pennell Coast